Operation Causeway was a planned United States invasion of Formosa (Taiwan) during World War II. Formosa was a Japanese colony since the nineteenth century. It was seen as a possible next step in the planned Allied advance across the Pacific after the capture of the Marianas in summer 1944.

Proposal and purpose
According to the planners, Formosa would have provided a suitable base for the strategic bombing campaign against Japan as well as a staging area for the foreseen invasion of the Japanese home islands. Its planned capture was also seen as a symbolic demonstration of American support for the continued participation of China in the war against Japan.

Support and opposition
Admiral Ernest J. King, Chief of Naval Operations, was a high-profile supporter of the Formosa plan. He was opposed by General Douglas MacArthur, commander-in-chief of the South West Pacific Area, who pushed for the invasion of Luzon in the Philippines and argued for bypassing Formosa. Admiral Raymond Spruance, commanding the Fifth Fleet, concurred with MacArthur that Operation Causeway was unrealistic without further significant reinforcements in the Pacific theater; instead, Spruance proposed the capture of Iwo Jima and Okinawa, the latter an island smaller than Formosa and therefore not requiring additional troops diverted from Europe.

Rejection
At a high-level meeting in Pearl Harbor in July 1944, President Roosevelt conferred with General MacArthur and Admiral Chester W. Nimitz, Commander-in-Chief of the Pacific Fleet. Both commanders balked at Operation Causeway and advised the president accordingly. Instead MacArthur's plan for the invasion of Luzon and Spruance's proposals were put into operation.

Sources

World War II operations and battles of the Pacific theatre
Cancelled invasions
Cancelled military operations of World War II
Cancelled military operations involving the United States
Military operations of World War II